Abdollahabad (also Romanized as ‘Abdollahābād; also known as ‘Abdolābād) is a village in Khobriz Rural District, in the Central District of Arsanjan County, Fars Province, Iran. At the 2006 census, its population was 197, in 49 families.

References 

Populated places in Arsanjan County